Marko Mandić (Croatian: Марко Мандић, 20 July 1939 – 29 June 1991) was a Croatian rower. 

Mandić was born in Goriš in 1939. He competed for Yugoslavia in the 1964 European Rowing Championships in Amsterdam in the eight competition where he won a bronze medal. The same team competed two months later in the men's eight at the 1964 Summer Olympics where they came fourth. Mandić competed in the coxless four at the 1972 Summer Olympics where they were eliminated in the repêchage. He died in 1991 in Bled.

The whole 1964 Olympic team was inducted into the Slovenian Athletes Hall of Fame in 2012.

References

1939 births
1991 deaths
Croatian male rowers
Yugoslav male rowers
Rowers at the 1964 Summer Olympics
Rowers at the 1972 Summer Olympics
Olympic rowers of Yugoslavia
Rowers from Split, Croatia
European Rowing Championships medalists